Black Devil Doll from Hell is a 1984 American blaxploitation horror film written, produced, and directed by Chester Novell Turner, in his directorial debut. The film stars Shirley L. Jones.

A copy of the film is held in the Yale University Libraries' archives.

Plot 

Helen Black is a religious young woman who is determined to abstain from sex until marriage. This all changes once she purchases a supposedly haunted doll from a thrift store, after which point Helen's sex drive becomes insatiable.

Cast 
 Shirley L. Jones as Helen Black
 Obie Dunson as Preacher
 Thalia Holloway as Second Buyer
 Jeanine Johican as Church Friend
 Ricky Roach as First Lover
 Marie Sainvilvs as Saleslady
 Chester Tankersley as Second Lover
 Kathleen Turner as Barbara's Voice
 Keefe L. Turner as The Doll

Production 

When Turner began working on Black Devil Doll from Hell, he initially intended the story to be one of several featured in the anthology film Tales from the QuadeaD Zone. The short was turned into a feature-length film after Turner noted that the script had grown too long to be part of an anthology. Turner wrote the script over a period of three and a half days; however, filming took place over several years on a budget of about $10,000. Most of the film's budget went towards paying the cast and crew involved with the film, as Turner was unaware that it is accepted practice for some performers and crew to work for free when making an independent film. During filming Turner began dating actress Shirley L. Jones, who would return for Turner's second film.

The titular devil doll from the movie was modeled after the performer Rick James and Turner's young nephew portrayed the doll in walking scenes. As Turner had no prior experience in filmmaking, he took a correspondence course to help him with the film.

Release 
The film was first released in 1984 through Hollywood Home Video, a working relationship that Turner has described as exploitative. Copies of Black Devil Doll from Hell were circulated to various video rental stores, where they were rented "over and over and over". Despite the film enjoying some popularity, Turner only received $6 for each VHS copy purchased and was not certain how many copies of the film were actually sold by the distributor. Hollywood Home Video also made extensive edits to Turner's film, resulting in the removal of seventy minutes of footage and of Turner's original soundtrack.

In 2013 Massacre Video released Black Devil Doll from Hell as part of a DVD box set along with Tales from the QuadeaD Zone. The set also featured commentary from Turner and Shirley L. Jones, a documentary on both films, and the original version of Black Devil Doll from Hell. Both Black Devil Doll from Hell and Tales from the QuadeaD Zone received a screening in Austin, Texas that same year, as part of a film event hosted by the Austin Film Society and attended by both Turner and Jones.

Reception 

HorrorNews.net commented that the film was "hard to recommend" but contained a good ending and "some truly unbelievable lines of dialogue". DVD Talk gave Black Devil Doll from Hell two stars, remarking that they preferred the edited cut over Turner's original version. Shock Cinema Magazine reviewed the movie in 1991, writing that "It revels unashamedly in its own misogynistic mindset and utter incompetency, and I can't imagine an uglier, more unbelievably inept piece of rotgut. Difficult to endure, impossible to forget, and loads of fun to discuss afterward (sorta like bragging about battle wounds)."

Graeme Clark from The Spinning Image panned the film, awarding it one out of ten stars, calling it "Absolutely dreadful by any estimate, but difficult to look away from (and listen to, thanks to the piercing and droning soundtrack)". In his review, Clark criticized the film's dialogue, sexual content as being "almost softcore pornographic", and called the title character "a low rent Chucky". Reviewing the 2013 release of the film, Nathaniel Thompson from Mondo Digital offered similar criticism. In his review Thompson wrote, "Love it or hate it, there's no way you'll ever forget Black Devil Doll from Hell. The monotonous (and loud) Casio soundtrack, hallucinatory pacing, profane script, and amateur performances combine to create a Black Devil Doll from Hell DIY video project so far removed from anything remotely resembling normality that most wondered how it ever escaped onto commercial VHS release at all."

References

External links
 
 
 

1984 films
1984 direct-to-video films
1984 directorial debut films
1984 horror films
1980s American films
1980s English-language films
1980s supernatural horror films
African-American horror films
American direct-to-video films
American supernatural horror films
Blaxploitation films
Camcorder films
Direct-to-video horror films
Films about haunted dolls
Puppet films